In 1898 the first women's magazine was published in China. The number of women's magazines has increased in the country since the late 1980s. In addition to national titles international magazines are also published in the country. Madame Figaro, and Elle are among such titles both of which entered into the Chinese market in 1988. In 1998 Cosmopolitan began to be circulated in the country. Esquire is the first international men's magazine which entered the Chinese magazine market in 1999. From the 2000s several Japanese magazines began to be circulated in Chinese language in the country, including CanCam.

Total number of magazines in China was 8,889 in 2001 when China became a member of the World Trade Organization (WTO). Following the accession of China to the WTO advertising revenues of the magazines significantly increased. The number of foreign consumer magazines was sixty-nine in 2009.

The following is an incomplete list of current and defunct magazines published in China. They are published in Chinese or other languages.

A
 Asia Literary Review
 Asian Private Banker

B

 BeijingKids
 Beijing Review
 Beijing This Month
 The Beijinger
 Bosom Friend

C

 Caijing
 Cawaii!
 China Business Network Weekly
 China Computer Education
 China Pictorial
 China Plastic & Rubber Journal
 China Policy Review
 China Today
 Chinese Literature
 Chinese National Geography
 Chinese Recorder and Missionary Journal
 The Chinese Repository
 City Weekend
 Contemporary Review
 Creation Quarterly
 The Culture Arts Review

D

 Diànzǐ Yóuxì Ruǎnjiàn
 Dushu
 Duzhe

F

 Fiction Monthly
 Freezing Point
 Funü shibao
 Funü zazhi

G
 Gafencu Men
 Gushi Hui

H
 Hongqi

J
 Jintian

L
 Ling Long
 The Young Companion

M
 Metallurgy Analysis
 Modern Sketch
 More Hangzhou

N

 New Youth
 Nubao
 Numéro
 Nüzi shijie

O
 The Outlook Magazine

P

 Painkiller
 Party
 People's Literature
 Play

Q
 Qiushi

R
 Ray Li
 Renditions

S

 Science Fiction World
 Shanghai Business Review
 Shanghai Manhua
 Shanghai Review of Books
 Shijie zhishi
 Shishang xiansheng
 Shiyue
 South Reviews
 Star Girls

T

 Tattler
 Tbjhome
 That's Beijing
 That's PRD
 That's Shanghai
 Tian Feng
 The Tiger
 The Traveler
 The Twenty-First Century
 Typhoon Club

V
 Vestnik Manʹchzhurii
 Vogue China

W

 The West China Missionary News
 Wings of China
 Women's Lives
 The World of Chinese

X
 Xinmin Weekly
 Xueren

Y

 Yanhuang Chunqiu
 The Young Companion
 Youth Film Handbook

See also
 List of newspapers in China

References

China
Lists of mass media in China